Chen Li may refer to:

 Chen Li (emperor) (died 1408), second and the last emperor of the Chen Han regime in the late Yuan dynasty of China
 Chen Li (scholar) (1810–1882), Cantonese scholar of the evidential research school
 Chen Li (tennis) (1971), Chinese tennis player

See also
Li Chen (disambiguation)